The Wooster Trailers were an Ohio–Pennsylvania League minor league baseball team that played in 1905. The club, based in Wooster, Ohio, was managed by Jess Bowers. It is the only known professional baseball team to be based in Wooster. The team earned the nickname "Trailers" after it lost the first two games of the season, hence it was trailing in the standings.

References

Defunct minor league baseball teams
Baseball teams established in 1905
1905 establishments in Ohio
Defunct baseball teams in Ohio
Baseball teams disestablished in 1905
Ohio-Pennsylvania League teams